Jenny Laura Marx (26 September 1845 – 25 November 1911) was a socialist activist. The second daughter of Karl Marx and Jenny von Westphalen, she married revolutionary writer Paul Lafargue in 1868. The two committed suicide together in 1911.

Life 
Laura Marx was born in Brussels and moved with her parents to France, then Prussia, before the family settled in London in June 1849. Paul Lafargue, born in Santiago De Cuba, was a young French socialist who came to London in 1866 to work for the First International. There he became a friend of Karl Marx and got to know Marx's family, especially Laura, who fell in love with him.

Lafargue and Laura married at St Pancras registry office in April 1868. During their first three-years of marriage they had three children, two boys and a girl, all of whom died in infancy. They had no other children. They spent several decades in political work together, translating Karl Marx's work into French, and spreading Marxism both in France and Spain. During most of their lives, they were financially supported by Friedrich Engels. They also inherited much of Engels' estate when he died in 1895.

On 25 November 1911, the couple committed suicide together, having decided they had nothing left to give to the movement to which they had devoted their lives. Laura was 66 and Paul was 69. In their suicide letter, they explained why they committed suicide. Lafargue wrote:

Healthy in body and mind, I end my life before pitiless old age which has taken from me my pleasures and joys one after another; and which has been stripping me of my physical and mental powers, can paralyse my energy and break my will, making me a burden to myself and to others.

For some years I had promised myself not to live beyond 70; and I fixed the exact year for my departure from life. I prepared the method for the execution of our resolution, it was a hypodermic of cyanide acid.

I die with the supreme joy of knowing that at some future time, the cause to which I have been devoted for forty-five years will triumph.

Long live Communism! Long Live the international socialism!

Vladimir Lenin, who had lived in Paris since 1907 and was a close friend, was one of the speakers at the funeral as representative of RSDLP. He later told his wife Nadezhda Krupskaya:

"If one cannot work for the Party any longer, one must be able to look truth in the face and die like the Lafargues."

Ancestry

Works 
 Laura Lafargue / Eleanor Marx – Aveling: Briefe und Schriften von Karl Marx ... Oktober 1895. In: Die Neue Zeit, 1895, p. 121
 Karl Marx / Friedrich Engels:Manifeste du parti communiste. (Traduction de Laura Lafargue). V. Giard et E. Brière, Paris 1897
 Karl Marx (das ist Friedrich Engels):Révolution et contre-révolution en Allemagne. Trad. par Laura Lafargue. V. Giard et E. Brière, Paris 1900 (Bibliothèque socialiste internationale 6)
 Friedrich Engels:Religion, philosophie, socialisme. Trad. par Paul & Laura Lafargue. Jacques, Paris 1901 (Bibliothèque d'études socialistes  8)
 Karl Marx:Contribution à la critique de l'économie politique. Traduit sur la 2e édition allemande de Karl Kautsky par Laura Lafargue. V. Giard et E. Brière, Paris 1909 (Bibliothèque socialiste internationale  11)

Notes

Bibliography 
 Franz Mehring: Paul und Laura Lafargue. In: Die Neue Zeit, Stuttgart, 30. jg. 1911–1912, 1st Vol., p. 337-343
 Friedrich Engels Paul et Laura Lafargue. Correspondance. Textes recueillis, annotés et présentés par Émile Bottigelli. Traductions de l'anglais par Paul Meier. Tome I.Édition Sociales, Paris 1956
 Friedrich Engels Paul et Laura Lafargue. Correspondance. Textes recueillis, annotés et présentés par Émile Bottigelli. Traductions de l'anglais par Paul Meier. Tome II., Édition Sociales, Paris 1956
 Friedrich Engels Paul et Laura Lafargue. Correspondance. Textes recueillis, annotés et présentés par Émile Bottigelli. Traductions de l'anglais par Paul Meier. Tome III., Édition Sociales, Paris 1959
 Olga Meier (Hrsg.): Die Töchter von Karl Marx. Unveröffentlichte Briefe. aus dem Französischen und dem Englischen von Karin Kersten und Jutta Prasse. Kiepenheuer & Witsch, Köln 1981 
 Irina Bach / Olga Senekina: "Briefe von Mitgliedern der Familie Marx an Friedrich Engels". In: Marx-Engels-Jahrbuch 6. Dietz Verlag, Berlin 1983, p. 311-366
 Olga Worobjowa / Irma Senelnikowa: Die Töchter von Marx 4. ed. Dietz Verlag, Berlin 1984
 Rosie Rudich: "Neue Briefe von Karl Marx und Laura Lafargue". In: Marx-Engels-Jahrbuch 8. Dietz Verlag, Berlin 1985, p. 283-314 
 Inge Werchan: "Engels begutachtete Laura Lafargues überarbeitete französische Übersetzung des "Kommunistischen Manifests" aus dem Jahre 1894". In: Beiträge zur Marx-Erngels-Forschung 24, Berlin 1988, p. 112-116 
 Katharina Raabe (Hrsg): Deutsche Schwestern. Vierzehn Porträts. Rowohlt Berlin, Berlin 1997 
 Familie Marx privat. Akademie Verlag, Berlin 2005 
 Renate Merkel-Melis: "'… that most untranslateable of documents …'. Engels’ Revision der französischen Übersetzung des "Kommunistischen Manifests" von Laura Lafargue". In: Marx-Engels-Jahrbuch 2006. Akademie-Verlag, Berlin 2007
 

1845 births
1911 deaths
1911 suicides
19th-century German women
Activists from Brussels
Burials at Père Lachaise Cemetery
German communists
German Marxists
German people of Jewish descent
German people of Scottish descent
German socialists
Jewish socialists
Joint suicides
Karl Marx
People educated at South Hampstead High School
Suicides in France